My Favorite Year is a musical with a book by Joseph Dougherty, music by Stephen Flaherty, and lyrics by Lynn Ahrens. It is based on the 1982 film of the same name.

Production history
The musical opened on Broadway at Lincoln Center's Vivian Beaumont Theater on December 10, 1992 and closed on January 10, 1993 after 36 performances and 45 previews. The cast included Evan Pappas, Tim Curry, Tom Mardirosian, Katie Finneran, Andrea Martin (in her Broadway debut), Josh Mostel, and Lainie Kazan, who reprised the role of Benjy's mother she had played in the film. The show was directed by Ron Lagomarsino and choreographed by Thommie Walsh, with scenic design by Thomas Lynch, costume design by Patricia Zipprodt, and lighting design by Jules Fisher, with associate lighting designer Peggy Eisenhauer.

The creative team constantly reworked the troubled production during previews.

My Favorite Year received mixed-to-negative reviews. The New York Times'''s Frank Rich called the musical "a missed opportunity, a bustling but too frequently flat musical that suffers from another vogue of the 1950s, an identity crisis," and disapproved of the melodramatic turn taken in the show's second act. Time magazine wrote that is a "barren Broadway musical."

An original cast recording was released on the RCA Victor label.

In March 2007, The Chicago Sun-Times revealed that Flaherty and Ahrens were "reworking the show with an eye on a new Broadway production."  Flaherty said that "In hindsight, I think our decision to paint the musical in somewhat darker colors was a mistake." Among the revisions made to the show are two new songs, incorporated into a March 2007 production of the show at the Bailiwick Repertory Theatre, Chicago.

Musicals Tonight! in New York City presented a staged concert in April 2003.

The York Theatre Company Musicals in Mufti in New York City presented a staged concert in December 2014. Lynn Ahrens reminisced about the first time Andrea Martin sang "Professional Showbizness Comedy": "It bombed.... By the time we got done with our rewrites...she stopped the show."

Cast

Plot
In the 1950s, Benjy Stone (a Mel Brooks-type), is a sketch writer for a live television variety show starring King Kaiser (a Sid Caesar-type) ("Twenty Million People"). Signed for a guest appearance is Alan Swann (an Errol Flynn-type), a one-time movie idol whose career was disrupted by his addiction to alcohol and loose women. Benjy writes a sketch for Swann about a Musketeer and a princess being captured ("The Musketeer Sketch"). The task of keeping him sober and celibate until airtime falls to Benjy, who soon finds himself involved in a sequence of shenanigans.
 
Various characters, including Benjy's pushy mother Belle Steinberg Carroca and Alan Swann's estranged daughter Tess, complicate Benjy's task. The other writers, Sy, Alice and Herb, add to the chaos.

Differences from the original film
 In the film, there is a subplot surrounding King Kaiser angering Karl Rojeck, a corrupt union boss with a comedy sketch depicting Rojek as a stereotypical gangster. Neither the character of Rojeck nor the sketch that angered him is included in the plot of the musical.
 In the film's epilogue, Benjy relates that Swann agreed to visit his daughter Tess in person; in the musical, Tess invites Swann to an award ceremony, and they meet there. They also reunite in the final song.
 The Musketeer sketch is minor to the plot in the film; in the musical, it is central to the plot, being that it is the sketch Benjy wrote for Swann. Four of the show's songs are dedicated to it.

Songs

Act I
 "Twenty Million People" – Benjy and Company
 "Larger Than Life" – Benjy
 "The Musketeer Sketch" – Benjy, Sy, King, Alice, K.C., Leo and Herb
 "Waldorf Suite" – Benjy, Offstage Chorus
 "Rookie in the Ring" – Belle
 "Manhattan" – Alan and Ensemble
 "Naked in Bethesda Fountain" – Sy, Alice, Leo, Herb and K.C.
 "The Gospel According to King" – King, Alan and Ensemble
 "The Musketeer Sketch Rehearsal" – Musketeers, Benjy, and Alan
 "Funny / The Duck Joke" – K. C. and Alice
 "The Musketeer Sketch Rehearsal Part II" – King, Alan and Ensemble
 "Welcome to Brooklyn" – Morty, Rookie, Belle, Sadie, Benjy, Alan and Neighbors
 "If the World Were Like the Movies" – Alan

Act II
 "Exits" – Alan
 "Shut Up and Dance" – K.C., Benjy, Offstage Chorus
 "Professional Showbizness Comedy" – Alice, King and Ensemble
 "The Lights Come Up" – Alan and Benjy
 "Maxford House" – Maxford House Girls
 "The Musketeer Sketch Finale" – King and Ensemble
 "My Favorite Year" – Benjy and Company

The album,= My Favorite Year (Original Broadway Cast Recording) was released in 1993 with Andrea Martin, Lainie Kazan and Tim Curry on RCA Victor.

Awards and nominations

Original Broadway production

References

External links

Plot at guidetomusicaltheatre.com
 My Favorite Year'' at the Music Theatre International website

1992 musicals
Broadway musicals
Musicals based on films
Musicals by Lynn Ahrens
Musicals by Stephen Flaherty
Plays set in New York City
Tony Award-winning musicals